Acanthoecida is an order of Choanoflagellates belonging to the class Choanoflagellatea. It is a type of heterotrophic nanoflagellate that feeds on suspended particles.

Families:
 Acanthoecidae Norris, 1965
 Stephanoecidae Leadbeater in Nitsche et al., 2011

References

External links
 https://doi.org/10.1017/CBO9781139051125.011 

Choanoflagellatea